Klamath (Tolowa: Taa-chit) is an unincorporated, rural census-designated place (CDP) in Del Norte County, California, situated on US Route 101 inland from the mouth of the Klamath River.  The current population of Klamath, California is 632 based on US Census estimates, down from 779 recorded in the 2010 US census. Klamath is at an elevation of 30 feet (9 m). Klamath is located within the Yurok Indian Reservation.

The original town center was destroyed by the 1964 Flood. Streets and sidewalks of this original site, west of US 101 and the current site of the town's core, remain visible.

Geography

Climate
The region experiences warm (but not hot) and dry summers, with no average monthly temperatures above .  According to the Köppen Climate Classification system, Klamath has a warm-summer Mediterranean climate, abbreviated "Csb" on climate maps.

Demographics

2010
At the 2010 census Klamath had a population of 779. The racial makeup of Klamath was 379 (48.7%) White, 1 (0.1%) African American, 325 (41.7%) Native American, 3 (0.4%) Asian, 0 (0.0%) Pacific Islander, 5 (0.6%) from other races, and 66 (8.5%) from two or more races. Hispanic or Latino of any race were 90 people (11.6%).

The census reported that 775 people (99.5% of the population) lived in households, 4 (0.5%) lived in non-institutionalized group quarters, and no one was institutionalized.

There were 307 households, 83 (27.0%) had children under the age of 18 living in them, 107 (34.9%) were opposite-sex married couples living together, 37 (12.1%) had a female householder with no husband present, 30 (9.8%) had a male householder with no wife present. There were 38 (12.4%) unmarried opposite-sex partnerships, and 5 (1.6%) same-sex married couples or partnerships. 94 households (30.6%) were one person and 35 (11.4%) had someone living alone who was 65 or older. The average household size was 2.52. There were 174 families (56.7% of households); the average family size was 3.20.

The age distribution was 183 people (23.5%) under the age of 18, 53 people (6.8%) aged 18 to 24, 168 people (21.6%) aged 25 to 44, 231 people (29.7%) aged 45 to 64, and 144 people (18.5%) who were 65 or older. The median age was 43.1 years. For every 100 females, there were 107.2 males. For every 100 females age 18 and over, there were 109.9 males.

There were 406 housing units at an average density of ,of which 307 were occupied, 173 (56.4%) by the owners and 134 (43.6%) by renters.  The homeowner vacancy rate was 3.9%; the rental vacancy rate was 8.8%. 398 people (51.1% of the population) lived in owner-occupied housing units and 377 people (48.4%) lived in rental housing units.

2000
At the 2000 census there were 651 people, 264 households, and 177 families in the CDP. The racial makeup of the CDP was 58.37% White, 34.25% Native American, 0.77% Asian, 2.15% from other races, and 4.45% from two or more races. 5.53% of the population were Hispanic or Latino of any race.
Of the 264 households 25.8% had children under the age of 18 living with them, 48.5% were married couples living together, 11.4% had a female householder with no husband present, and 32.6% were non-families. 27.3% of households were one person and 10.2% were one person aged 65 or older. The average household size was 2.39 and the average family size was 2.83.

The age distribution was 24.4% under the age of 18, 8.6% from 18 to 24, 21.8% from 25 to 44, 24.4% from 45 to 64, and 20.7% 65 or older. The median age was 41 years. For every 100 females, there were 110.7 males. For every 100 females age 18 and over, there were 104.1 males.

The median household income was $29,231 and the median family income  was $29,417. Males had a median income of $24,750 versus $22,500 for females. The per capita income for the CDP was $13,660. About 11.2% of families and 15.2% of the population were below the poverty line, including 13.5% of those under age 18 and 7.9% of those age 65 or over.

Economy 

Salmon fishing was a major component of the local economy. As of late, fish stocks are in decline due to political feuds with upstream agribusiness water users in the Klamath Falls area.

Arts and culture
Klamath has a  statue of Babe the Blue Ox, the legendary sidekick of Paul Bunyan, the famous mythical lumberjack, at Trees of Mystery. On November 20, 2007, the head of the statue fell off; it has since been repaired.

Klamath is home to one of three California redwood trees that can be driven through.

Government

Notable people
 Tom Darby – American journalist, Nevada Broadcast Hall of Fame inductee, author and blogger. He currently lives in Spanish Springs, Nevada.

See also
 
 Trees of Mystery

References

Census-designated places in Del Norte County, California
Redwood National and State Parks
Census-designated places in California
Populated coastal places in California